Rex Hartwig and Lew Hoad were the defending champions, but Hartwig was ineligible to compete after turning professional. Hoad partnered with Ken Rosewall, and they defeated Nicola Pietrangeli and Orlando Sirola in the final, 7–5, 6–2, 6–1 to win the gentlemen's doubles tennis title at the 1956 Wimbledon Championship.

Seeds

  Lew Hoad /  Ken Rosewall (champions)
  Ham Richardson /  Vic Seixas (quarterfinals)
  Don Candy /  Bob Perry (quarterfinals)
  Luis Ayala /  Sven Davidson (quarterfinals)

Draw

Finals

Top half

Section 1

Section 2

Bottom half

Section 3

Section 4

References

External links

Men's Doubles
Wimbledon Championship by year – Men's doubles